Europe is an album by Paul Motian and the Electric Bebop Band released on the German Winter & Winter label in 2000. The album is the group's fifth release, following Paul Motian and the Electric Bebop Band (1992), Reincarnation of a Love Bird (1995), Flight of the Blue Jay (1997) and Play Monk and Powell (1998). The band includes saxophonists Chris Cheek and Pietro Tonolo, guitarists Ben Monder and Steve Cardenas, and bass guitarist Anders Christensen.

Reception
The Allmusic review by Alex Henderson awarded the album 3 stars, stating: "Europe is essentially a straight-ahead hard bop/post-bop date, and yet, it isn't necessarily an album that jazz purists will be comfortable with. That's because Motian doesn't stick to the type of all-acoustic format that purists expect... Europe is a solid effort that will please those who admire Motian's flexibility and open-mindedness".

Track listing
 "Oska T." (Thelonious Monk) - 2:13 
 "Birdfeathers" (Charlie Parker) - 3:04 
 "Blue Midnight" (Paul Motian) - 7:03 
 "Introspection" (Monk) - 5:21 
 "New Moon" (Steve Cardenas) - 5:46 
 "Fiasco" (Motian) - 3:21 
 "Gallops Gallop" (Monk) - 3:56 
 "If You Could See Me Now" (Tadd Dameron, Carl Sigman) - 6:23 
 "2300 Skidoo" (Herbie Nichols) - 4:28 
Recorded at Bauer Studios in Ludwigsburg, Germany, on July 2–5, 2000

Personnel
Paul Motian - drums
Pietro Tonolo - tenor saxophone, soprano saxophone
Chris Cheek - tenor saxophone
Steve Cardenas - electric guitar
Ben Monder - electric guitar
Anders Christensen - electric bass

References 

2001 albums
Paul Motian albums
Winter & Winter Records albums